Edward Barrett (born 1855) was a second class fireman serving in the United States Navy who received the Medal of Honor for bravery.

Biography
Flames began erupting from beneath the boilers and Barrett began working to extinguish the fires. Eventually the fires where extinguished and the boiler was repaired. For his actions during the fire he received the Medal October 18, 1884.

Medal of Honor citation
Rank and organization: Second Class Fireman, U.S. Navy. Born: 1855, Philadelphia, Pa. Accredited to: Pennsylvania. G.O. No.: 326, 18 October 1884.

Citation:

On board the U.S.S. Alaska at Callao Bay, Peru, 14 September 1881. Following the rupture of the stop-valve chamber, Barrett courageously hauled the fires from under the boiler of that vessel.

See also

List of Medal of Honor recipients in non-combat incidents

References

External links

1855 births
Year of death missing
United States Navy Medal of Honor recipients
United States Navy sailors
Military personnel from Philadelphia
Non-combat recipients of the Medal of Honor